William Napier may refer to:

 William Ewart Napier (1881–1952), American chess master
 William Francis Patrick Napier (1785–1860), British soldier and military historian
 William Napier (astronomer) (born 1940), astronomer and author
 William Napier, 9th Lord Napier (1786–1834), Royal Navy officer, politician and diplomat
 William Napier (novelist), historical novelist pseudonym of Christopher Hart
 William Napier (VC) (1828–1908), English recipient of the Victoria Cross
 William Napier (Royal Navy officer) (1877–1951), British admiral
 William Craig Emilius Napier (1818–1903), British general
 William Napier (lawyer) (1804–1879), Singapore lawyer and newspaper editor; Lieutenant-Governor of Labuan
 William Joseph Napier (1857–1925), member of parliament for Auckland, New Zealand
 William Napier, 11th Lord Napier (1846–1913), British peer
 William Napier, 13th Lord Napier (1900–1954), Scottish soldier and courtier
 William Napier, 7th Lord Napier (1730–1775), Scottish peer
 Sir William Napier, 3rd Baronet (1867–1915), British baronet and soldier

See also
 William Napper (disambiguation)